A humor magazine is a magazine specifically designed to deliver humorous content to its readership. These publications often offer satire and parody, but some also put an emphasis on cartoons, caricature, absurdity, one-liners, witty aphorisms, surrealism, neuroticism, gelotology, emotion-regulating humor, and/or humorous essays. Humor magazines first became popular in the early 19th century with specimens like Le Charivari (1832–1937) in France, Punch (1841–2002) in the United Kingdom and Vanity Fair (1859–1863) in the United States.

Contemporary humor magazines

Out-of-print humor magazines

Lists of magazines